Sean Willmott (born 23 May 1961) is a former speedway rider from England.

Speedway career 
Willmott reached the final of the British Speedway Championship in 1983. He rode in the top tier of British Speedway from 1977–1988, riding for various clubs.

References 

1961 births
Living people
British speedway riders
Bradford Dukes riders
Bristol Bulldogs riders
Hackney Hawks riders
Halifax Dukes riders
Weymouth Wildcats riders